The 2014–15 season (officially known as Liga de Plata and also as Torneo Luis Baltazar Ramírez) will be El Salvador's Segunda División de Fútbol Salvadoreño The season will be split into two championships Apertura 2014 and Clausura 2015. The champions of the Apertura and Clausura play the direct promotion playoff every year. The winner of that series ascends to Primera División de Fútbol de El Salvador.

Promotion and relegation 2013–2014 season
Teams promoted to Primera División de Fútbol Profesional - Apertura 2014
 Pasaquina

Teams relegated to Segunda División de Fútbol Salvadoreño  - Apertura 2014
 Firpo

Teams relegated to Tercera División de Fútbol Profesional - Apertura 2014
 Marte Soyapango (Later bought the spot of Turin FESA)
 ADI

Teams promoted from Tercera Division De Fútbol Profesional - Apertura 2014
 Atlético Comalapa
 C.D. Audaz

Teams that failed to register for the Apertura 2014
 Turin FESA (Sold their spot to Marte Soyapango)

Teams

Personnel and sponsoring

Apertura

Apertura 2014 Group standings

Grupo Centro Occidente

Grupo Centro Oriente

Second stage

Finals

First leg

Second leg

Guadalupano won 3-1 on aggregate.

Individual awards

Clausura

Personnel and sponsoring

Clausura 2015 Group standings

Grupo Centro Occidente

Grupo Centro Oriente

Second stage

Finals

First leg

Second leg

Real Destroyer won 5-2 on aggregate.

Individual awards

Aggregate table

Grupo Centro-Occidente

Grupo Centro-Oriente

External links
 https://archive.today/20130807152309/http://www.futbolsv.com/category/segunda-division/
 http://www.culebritamacheteada.com.sv/category/nacional/segunda-division-nacional/
 http://www.edhdeportes.com/futbol-nacional/segunda-division/

Segunda División de Fútbol Salvadoreño seasons
2014–15 in Salvadoran football
EL Sal